The European Games is a continental multi-sport event in the Olympic tradition contested by athletes from European nations and several transcontinental countries. The Games were envisioned and are governed by the European Olympic Committees (EOC), which announced their launch at its 41st General Assembly in Rome, on 8 December 2012.

History
The 2015 European Games, the first edition of the event, took place in Baku, Azerbaijan in June 2015, and further editions are planned every four years thereafter. The 2019 edition was held in Minsk, Belarus from 21 to 30 June. The 2023 edition will be held in Kraków, Poland.

The European Games are the 5th continental Games in the Olympic tradition to be initiated, after the Asian Games, Pan American Games, Pacific Games and African Games.  As of 2015, every sporting continent has a continental games.

The European Games are not related to the European Championships, a separate multi-sport event organised by individual European sports federations, bringing together the individual European Championships of athletics, swimming, artistic gymnastics, cycling, rowing, golf, and triathlon under a single 'brand' on a four-year cycle beginning in 2018, and broadcast by agreement with the EBU.

List of European Games

Sports

The 2019 Minsk European Games Sports Programme included 15 sports, 23 disciplines, 10 qualifying sports to Tokyo 2020, 4 Sports European Championship, for a total of 4082 competitors in 201 medal events.

The figures in each cell indicate the number of events for each sport contested at the respective Games.

Medal table

See also 

 Olympic Games
 World Games
 Commonwealth Games
 European Championships (multi-sport event)
 European Youth Olympic Festival
 African Games
 Asian Games
 Pacific Games
 Pan American Games
 South American Games
 Southeast Asian Games

References

External links 
 Official website

 
Recurring sporting events established in 2015
European international sports competitions
Multi-sport events in Europe
2015 establishments in Europe